A flow splitter, in hydraulic engineering, is any device designed to break up the flow of water or nappe over a dam wall or weir.  Flow splitters are used to reduce the likelihood of nappe vibration that might cause the failure of a dam wall by aerating the water flow. They are also used to restrict large flows of stormwater, in situations where a stormwater management device is designed only to treat small storms.

Another use for a flow splitter is to again break up the nappe so as to allow fish, such as salmon to swim upstream and over small weirs.

Split flow weirs are also used in drinking water and wastewater treatment plants (sewage treatment or industrial wastewater treatment) to proportion flows to different outlets in a junction box.

See also
Flow control structure

References

Hydraulic engineering